The 1928 Gonzaga Bulldogs football team was an American football team that represented Gonzaga University during the 1928 college football season. In their fourth year under head coach Maurice J. "Clipper" Smith, the Bulldogs compiled a 6–2–1 record and outscored all opponents by a total of 121 to 41.

In May 1929, Coach Smith left Gonzaga to become head coach at Santa Clara. In four years as head coach at Gonzaga, Smith compiled a 23–9–5 record.

Schedule

References

Gonzaga
Gonzaga Bulldogs football seasons
College football undefeated seasons
Gonzaga Bulldogs football